UFC Fight Night: Volkov vs. Rozenstruik (also known as UFC Fight Night 207 and UFC on ESPN+ 65 or UFC Vegas 56) was a mixed martial arts event produced by the Ultimate Fighting Championship that took place on June 4, 2022, at the UFC Apex facility in Enterprise, Nevada, part of the Las Vegas Metropolitan Area, United States.

Background
A heavyweight bout between former Bellator Heavyweight World Champion Alexander Volkov and Jairzinho Rozenstruik headlined the event.

A light heavyweight bout between Alonzo Menifield and Nicolae Negumereanu was scheduled for the event. However, Negumereanu was removed from the event due to undisclosed reasons and replaced by Askar Mozharov.

A middleweight bout between Joaquin Buckley and Abusupiyan Magomedov was linked to this event. However, the bout was cancelled for unknown reasons.

Darrick Minner was scheduled to face Damon Jackson in a featherweight bout at the event. However, Minner was pulled due to undisclosed reasons and replaced by newcomer Daniel Argueta.

Results

Bonus awards
The following fighters received $50,000 bonuses.
 Fight of the Night: Lucas Almeida vs. Michael Trizano
 Performance of the Night: Karine Silva and Ode' Osbourne

See also 

 List of UFC events
 List of current UFC fighters
 2022 in UFC

References 

UFC Fight Night
2022 in mixed martial arts
June 2022 sports events in the United States
2022 in sports in Nevada
Mixed martial arts in Las Vegas
Sports competitions in Las Vegas